Leroy Foster may refer to:

 LeRoy Foster (artist) (1925–1993), American painter
 Leroy Foster (musician) (1923–1958),  American musician